Amblymora australica is a species of beetle in the family Cerambycidae. It was described by Stephan von Breuning in 1948. It is known from Australia.

References

Amblymora
Beetles described in 1948